Sanah Moidutty (born 1 July 1991) is an Indian singer songwriter. She has been trained in Carnatic and Hindustani classical music as well as western vocals, and performs Indian classical and pop music.

Early life 

Sanah was born in Mumbai in a Malayali family from Kerala. Sanah started singing at the age of 5 and since wanted to be a singer. Her talent was identified by her mother, who encouraged her to learn music. She has been trained in Carnatic classical music for 6 years under Sundari Gopalakrishnan, Hindustani classical music for 7 years under Madhuvanti Pethe and Western vocals from Samantha Edwards. Sanah was also briefly trained under Ustad Ghulam Mustafa Khan sahab.

Her first stage show was at the age of 7. In a year's time she started singing with the children's troupe "Bacchon Ki Duniya" and few other groups. She did over 500 stage shows with the troupe or solo by the time she turned 18. She stood to be the 1st runner up in Hindustan Times Voice of Mumbai in 2007.

Career

She graduated from a computer engineering course in 2013 from St. Francis Institute of Technology, Mumbai. In 2011, she got her first break in Bollywood while still pursuing engineering. Sanah was noticed at a talent hunt in college after which she went on to sing for films. In 2012, Sanah decided to start her YouTube channel. She uploaded the first video of her rendition of the song Manmarziyan in 2013. It was recorded at the terrace of her residence and the song got a fair response. This was followed by O Rangrezz from Bhaag Milkha Bhaag. "Shankar –Ehsaan-Loy, who had composed the original, liked Sanah's version. She also shared the link with AR Rahman who happened to listen to the song and like it. This led to the 3 songs Sanah sang for A R Rahman in the following year." Sanah has rendered her voice in Hindi Films like Always Kabhi Kabhi, Gori Tere Pyaar Mein, The Attacks of 26/11, 24, Mohenjo Daro. Her popularity in the film industry & YouTube is on a rise ever since.

She has also sung for ad films like Cinthol and Eva deos. An episode of the musical TV show Sound Trek features Sanah with Achint Thakkar on Fox Life where they recreate a 70's Bollywood song "KITNA PYAARA VAADA HAI". In 2016 Sanah was also commissioned to create a cover of "Counting Stars" for the Bombay Festival. She actively releases music on her YouTube Channel in her name. The Malayalam Renditions released by Sanah have been very well received.  She has done Live shows across the globe, solo as well as with Vishal–Shekhar, Band SANAM, Keerthi Sagathia  and Ash King. The multilingual singer can confidently sing in English, Hindi, Marathi, Tamil, Malayalam, Telugu, Bengali, Punjabi, Gujarati and Kannada. As a part of Jammin, a digital music collaboration, Sanah has done a collaboration called "Ishq Abhi Bhi" with Bollywood composer Clinton Cerejo, and a collaboration called "Yaara" composed by A R Rahman.

In 2017, Sanah Moidutty performed at across the world including Almaty Kazakhstan at a two-day "Star of Asia" international festival that had the best, voices, sounds and rhythms from the Asian region. She is currently learning Hindustani classical with Sunil Borgaonkar Ji. In November 2017, she was awarded "Best Singing Sensation" for the year 2017 at the Asia Vision Movie Awards 2017 for the song Afeemi from Meri Pyaari Bindu.

Discography

Films

Independent Singles

Collaborations

References 

Living people
1991 births
Singers from Mumbai
Women musicians from Maharashtra
Indian women playback singers
Indian women pop singers
Indian women singer-songwriters
Indian singer-songwriters
Malayali people
Bollywood playback singers
Kannada playback singers
Tamil playback singers
Malayalam playback singers
Telugu playback singers
Hindi-language singers
Marathi-language singers
English-language singers from India
21st-century Indian singers
21st-century Indian women singers
21st-century Indian Muslims